Whitall Nicholson Perry (January 19, 1920 - November 18, 2005) was an American author born in Belmont, Massachusetts, member of the Perennialist School, which is based primarily on the work of René Guénon, Ananda Coomaraswamy and Frithjof Schuon. Perry’s major opus, A Treasury of Traditional Wisdom, is a compilation of thousands of quotations from all the great religious and esoteric traditions, supported by commentaries.

Biography
According to Harry Oldmeadow, Whitall Perry is one of the leading perennialist writers of American origin. Initially interested in Plato and Hindu Vedanta, he traveled to the East before settling in Cairo in 1946 with his wife. There he developed close ties with the French metaphysician René Guénon, which led him to join the tariqa of Frithjof Schuon.

He left Cairo in 1952, a year after Guénon's death, and settled in Lausanne, Switzerland, near Schuon, of whom he became a close associate. When Schuon emigrated to the United States in 1980, Perry and his wife followed him. He died in 2005 in Bloomington (Indiana).

Work
The metaphysician and art historian Ananda Coomaraswamy, whom Perry had known while studying at Harvard, had launched the idea of an encyclopedia that would collect wisdom from around the world. It was Perry who accomplished this monumental task, which took him 17 years, and which resulted in the publication in 1971 of A Treasury of Traditional Wisdom. This collection of more than 1,100 pages gathers thousands of quotations from all the great religious and esoteric traditions, supported by commentaries referring largely to the writings of Guénon, Coomaraswamy and Schuon.

In 1978, an English publisher commissioned him to write a study on George Gurdjieff in order to "help clear up the confusion surrounding the Armenian thaumaturgist"; the critical work was entitled Gurdjieff in the Light of Tradition. He is also the author of The Widening Breach: Evolutionism in the Mirror of Cosmology (1995) and Challenges to a Secular Society (1996), a collection of essays on the pseudo-mysticism generated by drugs, reincarnation, psychotherapy, modern gurus, Shakespeare, cosmology, and psychology.

Perry has also published some twenty articles in the English journal Studies in Comparative Religion on a variety of metaphysical and religious topics.

Bibliography
 Challenges to a Secular Society. Oakton, VA: Foundation for Traditional Studies, 1996.
 Gurdjieff in the Light of Tradition. Bedfont: Perennial Books, 1978; reed. Ghent, NY: Sophia Perennis, 2001.
 A Treasury of Traditional Wisdom. New York: Simon and Schuster, 1971; reed., with a preface by Huston Smith, San Francisco: Harper & Row, 1986; reed. Louisville, KY: Fons Vitae, 2000; reed. as The Spiritual Ascent: A Compendium of the World's Wisdom, Louisville, KY: Fons Vitae, 2008.
 The Widening Breach: Evolutionism in the Mirror of Cosmology. San Francisco: Harper & Row, 1995.

See also

Perennial Philosophy
Traditionalist School
Titus Burckhardt
Ananda Coomaraswamy
Martin Lings
William Stoddart
Angus Macnab
Bernard Philip Kelly

Notes and references

Notes

References

External links
 Short biography and photo
 Studies in Comparative Religion website

Traditionalist School
1920 births
2005 deaths
People from Belmont, Massachusetts
People from Bloomington, Indiana
20th-century American philosophers